Dictyocaryum lamarckianum is a species of flowering plant in the family Arecaceae. It is found in Panama and South America.

References

Trees of Peru
Trees of Ecuador
Trees of Colombia
Trees of Panama
Trees of Venezuela
Trees of Bolivia
Iriarteeae